Jiāngdōng (江东) may refer to the following in China:

Jiangnan, or Jiangdong, south of the lower reaches of the Yangtze River
Jiangnan East Circuit, a circuit of the Song dynasty that was split from Jiangnan Circuit
Jiangdong District, Ningbo, Zhejiang, now part of Yinzhou District
Jiangdong, Chao'an County, town in Chao'an County, Guangdong
Jiangdong, Jinhua, town in Jindong District, Jinhua, Zhejiang
Jiangdong Subdistrict, Chongqing, in Fuling District, Chongqing
Jiangdong Subdistrict, Nanjing, in Gulou District, Nanjing, Jiangsu
Jiangdong Subdistrict, Yiwu, in Yiwu, Zhejiang
 Jiangdong, Lanshan County (浆洞瑶族乡), a Yao ethnic township of Lanshan County, Hunan.
 Jiangdong, Hengshan (江东乡), a town of Hengshan County, Hunan.